Der Schatz im Niemandsland is a German television series.

See also
List of German television series

External links
 

German children's television series
1987 German television series debuts
1987 German television series endings
Television shows set in Berlin
Television shows set in Egypt
German-language television shows
ZDF original programming